The Jacob Wolf House is a historic house on Arkansas Highway 5 in Norfork, Arkansas.  It is a log structure, built in 1825 by Jacob Wolf, the first documented white settler of the area.  Architecturally it's a "saddle bag", which is a two-story dog trot with the second floor built over the open breezeway.  A two-story porch extends on one facade, with an outside stair giving access to the upper floor rooms.  The building's original chinking has been replaced by modern mortaring.  It is maintained by the Department of Arkansas Heritage as a historic house museum.

The house was listed on the National Register of Historic Places in 1973.

Gallery

See also
National Register of Historic Places listings in Baxter County, Arkansas
List of the oldest buildings in Arkansas

References

External links
 Jacob Wolf House - Department of Arkansas Heritage
 Wolf House - Baxter County Historical and Genealogical Society

Houses on the National Register of Historic Places in Arkansas
Houses completed in 1825
Houses in Baxter County, Arkansas
Museums in Baxter County, Arkansas
Historic house museums in Arkansas
National Register of Historic Places in Baxter County, Arkansas
Blacksmith shops
1825 establishments in Arkansas Territory
Dogtrot architecture in Arkansas
Log buildings and structures on the National Register of Historic Places in Arkansas